

Films

References

LGBT
1992 in LGBT history
1992